The Nigar Awards are divided in three sections, i.e. Urdu, Punjabi and Pushto film awards. For Punjabi films, the Nigar Awards started from 1970 (in 1967 and 1968, the Nigar Award for Best Punjabi Film was awarded). Since 1979, the award administration also started to give Nigar Awards to television personalities and since 1982, to stage artists.

Following is the list of Nigar Awards for Urdu films from 1957 to 2002 and 2017 and Nigar Awards for Punjabi films from 1967 to 2002.

1957

For Urdu films

1958

For Urdu films

1959

For Urdu films

1960

For Urdu films

1961

For Urdu films

1962

For Urdu films

1963

For Urdu films

1964

For Urdu films

1965

For Urdu films

1966

For Urdu films

1967

For Urdu films

For Punjabi films

1968

For Urdu films

For Punjabi films

1969

For Urdu films

1970

For Urdu films

For Punjabi films

1971

For Urdu films

For Punjabi films

1972

For Urdu films

For Punjabi films

1973

For Urdu films

For Punjabi films

1974

For Urdu films

For Punjabi films

1975

For Urdu films

For Punjabi films

1976

For Urdu films

For Punjabi films

1977

For Urdu films

For Punjabi films

1978

For Urdu films

For Punjabi films

1979

For Urdu films

For Punjabi films

For television

1980

For Urdu films

For Punjabi films

1981

For Urdu films

For Punjabi films

For television

1982

For Urdu films

For Punjabi films

For television

1983

For Urdu films

For Punjabi films

For television

1984

For Urdu films

For Punjabi films

For television

1985

For Urdu films

For Punjabi films

For television

1986

For Urdu films

For Punjabi films

For television

1987

For Urdu films

For Punjabi films

For television

1988

For Urdu films

For Punjabi films

For television

1989

For Urdu films

For Punjabi films

For television

1990

For Urdu films

For Punjabi films

For television

1991

For Urdu films

For Punjabi films

1992

For Urdu films

For Punjabi films

1993

For Urdu films

For Punjabi films

1994

For Urdu films

For Punjabi films

1995

For Urdu films

For Punjabi films

For television

1996

For Urdu films

For Punjabi films

1997

For Urdu films

For Punjabi films

1998

For Urdu films

For Punjabi films

For Television Serial

1999

For Urdu films

For Punjabi films

2000

For Urdu films

For Punjabi films

2001

For Urdu films

2002

For Urdu films

2017

See also
Nigar Awards
Nigar magazine 
Lux Style Awards

References

Sources 
 43rd Nigar awards ceremony
 List of Nigar awards from 1957 to 1971
 List of Nigar awards from 1972 to 1986
 Nigar Award history
 Nigar Award

Nigar Awards